Hypersypnoides is a genus of moths in the family Erebidae.

Species

Hypersypnoides admiratio (Prout, 1922)
Hypersypnoides astriger (Butler, 1885)
Hypersypnoides biocularis (Moore, 1867) 
Hypersypnoides caliginosus (Walker, 1865) 
Hypersypnoides catocaloides (Moore, 1867) 
Hypersypnoides congoensis Berio, 1954 
Hypersypnoides constellata (Moore, 1883) 
Hypersypnoides difformis Berio, 1958 
Hypersypnoides distinctus (Leech, 1889) 
Hypersypnoides fenellus (Swinhoe, 1902) 
Hypersypnoides formosensis (Hampson, 1926) 
Hypersypnoides heinrichi Laporte, 1979 
Hypersypnoides intermedius Berio, 1958 
Hypersypnoides marginalis (Hampson, 1894) 
Hypersypnoides marginatus (Leech, 1900) 
Hypersypnoides multrechti Berio, 1958 
Hypersypnoides oblongus (Berio, 1977) 
Hypersypnoides ochreicilia (Hampson, 1891) 
Hypersypnoides pela (Prout, 1926) 
Hypersypnoides perplaga Berio, 1958 
Hypersypnoides perpunctosus (Berio, 1973) 
Hypersypnoides plaga (Leech, 1900) 
Hypersypnoides postflavidus (Leech, 1900) 
Hypersypnoides pretiosissimus (Draudt, 1950) 
Hypersypnoides pseudoumbrosus (Berio, 1973) 
Hypersypnoides pulcher (Butler, 1881) 
Hypersypnoides punctosus (Walker, 1865) 
Hypersypnoides quadrinotatus (Leech, 1900) 
Hypersypnoides spodix (Prout, 1928) 
Hypersypnoides submarginatus (Walker, 1865) 
Hypersypnoides subolivaceus (Walker, 1863) 
Hypersypnoides umbrosa (Butler, 1881)

References
Natural History Museum Lepidoptera genus database

Sypnini
Moth genera